The peristasis was a four-sided porch or hallway of columns surrounding the cella in an ancient Greek peripteral temple.  This allowed priests to pass round the cella (along a pteron) in cultic processions.

If such a hall of columns surrounds a patio or garden, it is called a peristyle rather than a peristasis.

In ecclesial architecture, it is also used of the area between the baluster of a Catholic church and the high altar (what is usually called the sanctuary or chancel).

References 

Ancient Greek architecture
Ancient Roman architecture
Architectural elements